National Museum of Contemporary Art may refer to:

 National Museum of Contemporary Art, Athens (Greece)
 National Museum of Contemporary Art (Portugal)
 National Museum of Contemporary Art (Romania)
 National Museum of Modern and Contemporary Art (South Korea)